The following is a list of episodes for the television sitcom Murphy Brown. The series premiered on November 14, 1988, on CBS, and ended on May 18, 1998. A total of 260 episodes have aired, most recently airing its eleventh season. A 13-episode eleventh season revival of the series premiered on September 27, 2018.

Series overview

Episodes

Season 1 (1988–89)

Season 2 (1989–90)

Season 3 (1990–91)

Season 4 (1991–92)

Season 5 (1992–93)

Season 6 (1993–94)

Season 7 (1994–95)

Season 8 (1995–96)

Season 9 (1996–97)

Season 10 (1997–98)

Season 11 (2018)

Notes

References

Lists of American sitcom episodes

it:Otto sotto un tetto#Episodi